Hand Held is a 2010 documentary feature film about photojournalist Mike Carroll, one of the first photographers to travel to Romania after the fall of the communist regime of Nicolae Ceaușescu in 1989. When he arrived, he walked into one of the most horrific scenes of the 20th century. His photographs and heart wrenching stories of the pediatric AIDS epidemic in Romania ran in the Boston Globe and New York Times and opened the eyes of the western world to the plight of Romanian children.  The film chronicles Carroll's twenty-year journey to bring aid to children in a country he hardly knew, through the organization he founded, Romanian Children's Relief (RCR).

The film is produced and directed by Don Hahn.  After a charity premiere at WGBH in Boston, the film was selected for participation in the Heartland Film Festival, and has been the official selection of the Boulder International Film Festival, Newport Beach Film Festival, and the Rhode Island International Film Festival.  Hand Held's European premiere was in Bucharest in late 2010.  The director Don Hahn and subject Mike Carroll were introduced by United States Ambassador Mark Gitenstein who was in attendance at the premiere.

References

External links 
 U.S. Embassy film premiere story
 

2010 films
2010 documentary films
Documentary films about photographers
Documentary films about HIV/AIDS
American documentary films
Documentary films about children
Documentary films about Romania
Health in Romania
Documentary films about orphanages
Orphanages in Romania
Films produced by Don Hahn
Films directed by Don Hahn
HIV/AIDS in American films
2010s American films